Rockwood is a village in Somerset County, Maine, United States.  The village is centered on the west side of Moosehead Lake, the largest body of fresh water in the state.  Rockwood is a gateway to the north country and is located near Mount Kineo.

Rockwood is an unincorporated community with a significant enough population base to have its own post office and telephone exchange, but it has never been organized as a plantation or incorporated as a town. It currently maintains a registrar and clerk, but has never had a true organized municipal government. Its chief economical base is vacation destination and outdoor recreation. Rockwood is part of the township of Rockwood Strip (T1R1) located within the Northeast Somerset Unorganized Territory.

See also
 Historical U.S. Census Totals for Somerset County, Maine

References

External links
 Community website

Villages in Maine
Villages in Somerset County, Maine